Urosaurus clarionensis is a species of lizard. The common name for this species is the Clarion Island tree lizard. Its range includes Clarion Island in Baja California.

References 

Urosaurus
Reptiles of Mexico
Reptiles described in 1890